Sinopoda okinawana is a species of huntsman spider found in the Ryukyu Islands of Japan. It was first described by Peter Jäger and Hirotsugu Ono in 2000.

References

External links

Sparassidae
Spiders described in 2000
Endemic fauna of Japan
Spiders of Asia